David Bada (born April 24, 1995) is a German gridiron football defensive tackle for the Washington Commanders of the National Football League (NFL). A native of Munich, he played in the German Football League prior to joining Washington in 2020 as part of the NFL's International Player Pathway Program.

Professional career
Of Ghanaian descent, Bada was born on April 24, 1995, in Munich, Germany. He played in the German Football League as a member of the Munich Cowboys, Ingolstadt Dukes, and Schwäbisch Hall Unicorns, winning German Bowl XL with the latter in 2018. Bada was among several non-American players who participated in the National Football League's (NFL) International Player Pathway Program in 2019, with him being assigned to the Washington Commanders for the 2020 season. 

Bada spent the entire season with exempt status on Washington's practice squad, with him being retained under the same status for the 2021 season. He signed a futures contract with Washington on January 12, 2022. He was waived by the Commanders on August 30, 2022, and signed to the practice squad the next day. He moved to a standard practice squad contract in November 2022, which allowed him to play in games. He was signed to the active roster on December 31, 2022.

References

External links
Washington Commanders bio

1995 births
Living people
American football defensive tackles
German Football League players
German players of American football
International Player Pathway Program participants
Sportspeople from Munich
Washington Commanders players
Washington Football Team players
German expatriate sportspeople in the United States
Expatriate players of American football
German sportspeople of Ghanaian descent